Hemiphyllodactylus huishuiensis is a species of gecko. It is endemic to Guizhou, China and first described in Huishui County. It has also been found in Ziyun County.

References

Hemiphyllodactylus
Reptiles described in 2016
Endemic fauna of China
Reptiles of China